Novi list is the oldest Croatian daily newspaper published in Rijeka. It is read mostly in Primorje-Gorski Kotar County of Croatia, but it is distributed throughout the country.

Novi list had the distinction of being the only Croatian daily newspaper which kept a critical distance from the government of Franjo Tuđman during the 1990s. Up to the recent times, it was considered a centre-left newspaper, while in the last couple of years, after acquisition by the Slovakian JOJ Media House, it shifted its position to represent centre-right values, and became the only major Croatian newspaper which is very uncritical towards the last few Croatian government cabinets held by conservatives.

References

External links 
  

Daily newspapers published in Croatia
Newspapers published in Yugoslavia
Croatian-language newspapers
Mass media in Rijeka
Publications established in 1900
1900 establishments in Croatia